Jorge Daniel Guagua Tamayo (born September 28, 1981) is an Ecuadorian retired professional footballer who played as a defender. He is currently a sporting director of Club 9 de Octubre.

Club career
He was transferred to Colón de Santa Fe of Argentina right after the 2006 FIFA World Cup. After a year of steady performances there he returned to Ecuador to play for Club Sport Emelec. In December 2007 Guagua agreed to join Emelec's city rivals Barcelona SC
For the 2009 season he will make his return to the team that made him famous, El Nacional.

On December 1, 2011 his transfer to Mexican club Atlante FC was confirmed.

In June 2019, Guagua joined Club 9 de Octubre. Retiring at the end of the year, it was confirmed in January 2020, that Guagua would continue at 9 de Octubre as the club's new sporting director.

International career
A central defender, Guagua had a promising start to his career. His quick, technical abilities meant he was included in Ecuador’s squad for the 2001 FIFA World Youth Championship. In the same year, he made his debut for Ecuador’s senior side and he was named in his country’s squad for the 2006 FIFA World Cup. He also played in the 2007 Copa América held in Venezuela.

However, Guagua, who captained Club Deportivo El Nacional to the 2005 league championship, is generally used as a substitute behind record appearance maker Ivan Hurtado in Ecuador’s current side. He has 16 international caps and one goal as at May 19, 2006  against Mexico.

Honors
El Nacional
Serie A: 2005 Clausura

LDU Quito
Serie A: 2010
Recopa Sudamericana: 2010

Serie A

 2014 Campeonato Ecuatoriano de Fútbol.
 2015 Campeonato Ecuatoriano de Fútbol.
 2017 Campeonato Ecuatoriano de Fútbol.

References

External links
 
 
 
 

1981 births
Living people
Sportspeople from Esmeraldas, Ecuador
Ecuadorian footballers
Ecuadorian expatriate footballers
Ecuador international footballers
2001 Copa América players
2004 Copa América players
2006 FIFA World Cup players
2007 Copa América players
2014 FIFA World Cup players
C.D. El Nacional footballers
Club Atlético Colón footballers
C.S. Emelec footballers
Barcelona S.C. footballers
L.D.U. Quito footballers
Atlante F.C. footballers
S.D. Quito footballers
Guayaquil City F.C. footballers
Ecuadorian Serie A players
Liga MX players
Ecuadorian expatriate sportspeople in Mexico
Ecuadorian expatriate sportspeople in Argentina
Expatriate footballers in Mexico
Expatriate footballers in Argentina
Association football defenders